BB7 can refer to:

BB7, a postcode district in the BB postcode area
Avid BB7, a mechanical disc brake system for bicycles manufactured by SRAM Corporation
Big Brother 7, a television programme in various versions